St. Petersburg station was a passenger train station in St. Petersburg, Florida.  Located northwest of downtown, its former address was 3601 31st Street North, though access to the site is now only from 37th Avenue North.

History

Atlantic Coast Line
The station was built in 1963 by the Atlantic Coast Line Railroad, and was the third station in the city's history built to serve Atlantic Coast Line passenger trains.  It replaced a 1913 downtown St. Petersburg facility, at 2nd Avenue South and 9th Street, following the city's request that rail service be relocated away from the downtown area. The first station in St. Petersburg, built by the Orange Belt Railway shortly after its arrival in 1888, was located on 1st Avenue South where Priatek Plaza now stands. Major long distance trains that served the station included west coast sections of the Champion which originated in New York City, the City of Miami (originating from Chicago) the South Wind (originating from Chicago) and the Southland (originating from Chicago). Each of these (excepting the Southland) ran as a combined section from Jacksonville, Florida.

Seaboard Coast Line
By 1968, the station's operations came under the banner of the Seaboard Coast Line Railroad, formed by the merger of Atlantic Coast Line with rival company Seaboard Air Line Railroad.  The two formerly independent passenger operations were consolidated at this location, resulting in the closure of St. Petersburg's Seaboard Air Line Station.

Amtrak
The station's service under Seaboard Coast Line continued until 1971, when Amtrak assumed operation of most of the nation's passenger rail service.  Assigned station code STP, the St. Petersburg Amtrak station was serviced by trains such as the Champion, Floridian, Silver Star, and Silver Meteor.  On February 1, 1984, passenger rail service to St. Petersburg came to an end following the discontinuation of all Amtrak rail services in Pinellas County.  Operations continued from the St. Petersburg station for Amtrak's Thruway Motorcoach bus service, linking passengers to rail connections in Tampa and Orlando.  The station served as a boarding location for the bus service until the 1990s, when the station was closed.

Current status

After its usage as a train station ended, the former St. Petersburg station was renovated for use by a pharmaceutical company. The trackside awning that covered the platform, along with the block lettering "Saint Petersburg" were removed and disposed of in an early 2008 effort to "commercialize" the property. All traces of the property's link to rail history were removed, save for a slight concrete rise on the South end of the tracks where the edge of the platform once stood, and the secondary platforms, which served as picnic and storage areas. As of 2016, the station building is unoccupied and for sale.

Amtrak continues to offer Thruway Motorcoach service for St. Petersburg and all of Pinellas County through a station located in Pinellas Park, Florida. The Clearwater-St. Petersburg Amtrak Station retains the STP Amtrak code previously used by the 1963 St. Petersburg station.

See also

Clearwater Subdivision
Dunedin History Museum
Tarpon Springs Depot

References

Bibliography

External links

Official website
Trainweb.org - Amtrak St. Petersburg (STP)
Wikimapia - Former St. Petersburg, FL Amtrak Station

Amtrak Thruway Motorcoach stations in Florida
Atlantic Coast Line Railroad stations
Buildings and structures in St. Petersburg, Florida
Former Amtrak stations in Florida
Railway stations in the United States opened in 1963
Railway stations in Pinellas County, Florida
Seaboard Coast Line Railroad
Transportation in St. Petersburg, Florida
Railway stations closed in 1984
1963 establishments in Florida
1984 disestablishments in Florida